Jérôme Lebouc (born 26 December 1979) is a French former professional football midfielder. He previously played for Ligue 2 side Vannes and Stade Laval.

Honours
Vannes
 Coupe de la Ligue: runner-up 2008–09

References

External links
 

1979 births
Living people
People from Vitré, Ille-et-Vilaine
Sportspeople from Ille-et-Vilaine
Association football midfielders
French footballers
AS Vitré players
GSI Pontivy players
FC Marmande 47 players
Pau FC players
Valenciennes FC players
Thonon Evian Grand Genève F.C. players
Vannes OC players
Stade Lavallois players
Ligue 2 players
Footballers from Brittany
Brittany international footballers